Hypericum fasciculatum, known as peelbark St. Johnswort or sandweed, is a species of flowering plant in the St. Johnswort family, Hypericaceae, native to the southeastern United States. It is found from eastern North Carolina, south to southern Florida, west to eastern Louisiana. Kew's Plants of the World Online database also notes that it occurs in Cuba, though Cuba is not listed in several other sources. It was first described in 1797 by Jean-Baptiste Lamarck.

Peelbark St. Johnswort grows in wetlands including wet pine savannas, marshes, cypress ponds, and roadside ditches. It flowers from spring to fall.

References

fasciculatum
Plants described in 1797
Flora of the United States
Flora of Cuba
Taxa named by Jean-Baptiste Lamarck
Flora without expected TNC conservation status